Dole House is a historic home located at Lockport in Niagara County, New York.  It is a two-story stone structure built in 1840 in the Federal style by Isaac Dole, an early settler of Lockport. It was renovated in the 1890s in the Colonial Revival style.  It is one of approximately 75 stone residences remaining in the city of Lockport.

It was listed on the National Register of Historic Places in 2003.

References

External links
Dole House - Lockport, NY - U.S. National Register of Historic Places on Waymarking.com

Houses on the National Register of Historic Places in New York (state)
Federal architecture in New York (state)
Neoclassical architecture in New York (state)
Houses completed in 1840
Houses in Niagara County, New York
National Register of Historic Places in Niagara County, New York